Midlands is a province of Zimbabwe. It is home to various peoples. Located at a central point in the country, it contains speakers of Shona, Ndebele, Tswana, Sotho and Chewa, as well as of various other languages. Gweru, the third-largest city in Zimbabwe, is the capital of the province.

Midlands Province contains Kwekwe, a city of considerable mining and manufacturing industries, in which also the Sable Chemicals Trust maintains a presence.

Geography

Districts
Midlands Provinces is divided into eight districts:
 Chirumhanzu
 Gokwe North
 Gokwe South
 Gweru
 Kwekwe
 Mberengwa
 Shurugwi
 Zvishavane

Local government
The Provincial Administrator oversees all eight districts in the province, each district having its own district administrator. District Administrators work with local authorities in their respective districts. 
Local authorities have their own Chairmen (mayors for municipalities). These urban councils were established in accordance with the Zimbabwe Urban Councils Act, Chapter 29.15 while rural district councils were created in terms of the Zimbabwe Rural District Councils Act, Chapter 29.13

Of the eight districts, Gokwe South, Gweru, Kwekwe, Shurugwi and Zvishavane have two local government administrative authorities; the Urban District Council (town council or municipality) and the Rural District Council. Chirumhanzu, Gokwe North and Mberengwa districts have no urban councils.

Mberengwa's main economic activities are mostly concentrated at Mataga growth point.

Rural councils
The 8 rural district councils in all 8 subdivisions;
 Gokwe North RDC in Gokwe North
 Gokwe South RDC in Gokwe South
 Mberengwa RDC in Mberengwa
 Runde RDC in Zvishavane
 Tongogara RDC in Shurungwi
 Takawira RDC in Chirumhanzu
 Vungu RDC in Gweru
 Zibagwe RDC in Kwekwe

Urban councils
 City Councils in the province are Gweru and Kwekwe municipalities.
 Town Councils are Shurugwi, Zvishavane and Gokwe, Redcliff.

Education

See also
Provinces of Zimbabwe
Districts of Zimbabwe

References

 
Provinces of Zimbabwe